Lanciere was one of nineteen s built for the  (Royal Italian Navy) in the late 1930s and early 1940s. Completed in early 1939, she was one of the last of the first batch of a dozen ships to enter service.

Design and description
The Soldati-class destroyers were slightly improved versions of the preceding . Their wartime complement during was 206 officers and enlisted men.

Lanciere was powered by two Belluzzo geared steam turbines, each driving one propeller shaft using steam supplied by three Yarrow boilers.

Lancieres main battery consisted of four 50-caliber  guns in two twin-gun turrets, one each fore and aft of the superstructure. On a platform amidships was a 15-caliber 120-millimeter star shell gun. Anti-aircraft (AA) defense for the Soldatis was provided by eight  Breda Model 1935 guns. The ships were equipped with six  torpedo tubes in two triple mounts amidships. Although they were not provided with a sonar system for anti-submarine work, they were fitted with a pair of depth charge throwers. The ships could carry 48 mines.

Citations

Bibliography

External links
 Lanciere (1938) Marina Militare website

Soldati-class destroyers
1938 ships
World War II destroyers of Italy
Maritime incidents in March 1942
Ships built in Riva Trigoso